Paul Cooper, Jr. (born February 1, 1990) is an American professional basketball player who last played for BC Rustavi of the Georgian Superliga. He played college basketball at Gulf Coast Community College, Texas Tech, and Arkansas Tech.

High school career 
Cooper attended Auburndale High School in Auburndale, Florida, where he played basketball under head coach Eric Robinson. As a senior, he averaged 15 points and 9 rebounds and was named Class 5-A All-State Honorable Mention.

Collegiate career 
Cooper played college basketball with Gulf Coast State College as a freshman. He then transferred to Texas Tech of the NCAA Division I. However, he closed his career playing for Arkansas Tech.

Professional career 
Following an unsuccessful 2014 NBA draft, Cooper signed with the Mississauga Power of the National Basketball League of Canada (NBL) for his rookie season.

On October 1, 2015, Cooper signed with the London Lightning, however, he was waived before the start of the season. On December 30, he was acquired by the Island Storm, however, he was waived on January 8, 2016. Nine days later, he signed with the Windsor Express. On February 3, he was waived by Windsor.

Cooper signed with the KW Titans for its first year of existence in the 2016–17 NBL Canada season.

References

External links 
Paul Cooper at RealGM

1990 births
Living people
American expatriate basketball people in Canada
American men's basketball players
Arkansas Tech Wonder Boys basketball players
Basketball players from Florida
Forwards (basketball)
Gulf Coast State College alumni
Island Storm players
Junior college men's basketball players in the United States
KW Titans players
Mississauga Power players
Sportspeople from Winter Haven, Florida
Texas Tech Red Raiders basketball players
Windsor Express players